Silver Peak is a mountain located in the southern portion of the La Cloche Mountains at Killarney Provincial Park.

The mountain and nearby hilltops are composed of eroded quartzite with stretches of granite to the south. The peak is a remnant of an ancient mountain range that once covered the area.

See also
 La Cloche Mountains
 Killarney Provincial Park

References 

Mountains of Ontario